Nat Geo People is an international pay television channel owned by National Geographic Partners, a joint venture between The Walt Disney Company (73%) and the National Geographic Society (27%). Targeted at female audiences, with programming focusing on people and cultures, the channel is available in 50 countries in both linear and non-linear formats.

History
The channel was launched as Adventure One Channel on 1 November 1999, rebranded on 2003 as Adventure One (A1) and was later rebranded on 1 May 2007 as National Geographic Adventure, strengthening the overall Nat Geo presence. All countries adopted the change, except in Europe which instead changed A1 to Nat Geo Wild. Nat Geo Adventure is also a global adventure travel video and photography portal, which launched worldwide in 2009.

Nat Geo Adventure was aimed at younger audiences, providing programming based around outdoor adventure, travel and stories involving people having fun while exploring the world.

In early 2008, National Geographic Adventure Australia and Italy launched a new video sharing feature on their website called Blognotes.

In 2010, Nat Geo Adventure launched its own HD feed in Asia via AsiaSat 5.

Nat Geo Adventure Italy upgraded to HD on Sky Italia on 1 February 2012, At the time of launch (0500 UTC).

On 30 September 2013, it was announced that Nat Geo Adventure would be replaced by Nat Geo People on 1 March 2014. This would see Nat Geo People launch in HD where currently available, as well as in linear and non-linear formats, in 50 countries internationally. The rebrand would see the channel become more female-focused, with programming to focus on people and cultures.

Nat Geo People was replaced by Nat Geo Wild in Germany and Austria on 12 September 2017. The channel was closed down in Australia on 28 February 2018 with all popular TV shows moving to the National Geographic Channel. Nat Geo People in Italy closed on 1 October 2019, along with the Italian versions of Disney XD, Disney in English, Fox Comedy and Fox Animation, due to Sky Italia's deal with The Walt Disney Company Italy not being renewed. In Romania, the channel closed on 1 July 2018, but will be available again in 2020. The channel closed in Turkey on 31 May 2020. On April 27, 2021, for the 21 years of television broadcasting history, Disney and Fox Networks Group announced that Nat Geo People will be closing down and will be merge with National Geographic Asia on 1 October 2021, as well as a part of its winddown of traditional cable/satellite networks across Southeast Asia and Hong Kong in favor of Disney+ (in Singapore, Hong Kong, Taiwan and the Philippines) and Disney+ Hotstar (in Southeast Asia outside Singapore and the Philippines), thus the channel space once occupied by Adventure One Channel ceased to exist. The final program aired was an episode of Airport Below Zero.

As of 2023, Poland and Romania are the only regions where Nat Geo People is still active.

Programmes

62 Days at Sea
Adventure Wanted
Amazing Adventures of a Nobody UK
Amazing Adventures of a Nobody: Europe
Amazing Adventures of a Nobody
Around the World for Free
Art of Walking
Banged Up Abroad
The Best Job in the World
Bite Me With Dr. Mike Leahy
Bluelist Australia
Bondi Rescue
By Any Means
Calcutta Or Bust
Chasing Che: Latin America on a Motorcycle
Chasing Time
City Chase
City Chase Marrakech
Cooking the World
Cruise Ship Diaries
Cycling Home From Siberia With Rob Lilwall
Danger Men
David Rocco's Amalfi Getaway
David Rocco's Dolce Vita
Deadliest Journeys
Departures
Delinquent Gourmet
Destination Extreme
Dive Detectives
Don't Tell My Mother
Earth Tripping
Eccentric UK
Endurance Traveller
Exploring the Vine
Extreme Tourist Afghanistan
Finding Genghis
First Ascent
Food Lovers Guide to the Planet
Food School
The Frankincense Trail
Geo Sessions
Going Bush
Gone to Save the Planet
Graham's World
The Green Way Up
Into the Drink
Keeping up with the Joneses
Kimchi Chronicles
Lonely Planet: Roads Less Travelled
Long Way Down
Madagascar Maverick
Madventures
Making Tracks
Market Values
Meet the Amish
Meet the Natives
Miracle on Everest
Motorcycle Karma
The Music Nomad
Naked Lentil
Nomads
On Surfari
On the Camino de Santiago
One Man & His Campervan
Perilous Journeys
Pressure Cook
Race to the Bottom of The Earth
Racing Around the Clock
Racing to America
Reverse Exploration
The Ride
Sahara Sprinters
Solo
Somewhere in China
The Surgery Ship
Surfer's Journal
Travel Madness
Treks in a Wild World
Ultimate Traveller
Warrior Road Trip
Wedding Crasher: The Real Deal
Weird and Wonderful Hotels
Wheel2Wheel
Which Way To
Wild Ride
Word Travels
Word of Mouth
A World Apart
Young Global Hotshots

See also
 National Geographic Channel
 National Geographic Channel Australia

References

External links
 Nat Geo Adventure International Portal

Adventure travel
Television networks in Australia
Sports television in Australia
People
Disney television networks
Fox Networks Group
Cable television in Hong Kong
Television channels and stations established in 1999
English-language television stations in Australia
Disney Star